This is a list of newspapers in Italy. The number of daily print newspapers in Italy was 107 in 1950, whereas it was 78 in 1965. It has further declined since and 74 are listed in this article: 21 countrywide newspapers (including some "opinion" or "political" newspapers with very limited circulation, that are available only in Rome and few other places), 50 regional or local newspapers (some of which have a larger circulation than most countrywide ones) and 3 sports newspapers (all three having a much larger circulation on Mondays). The total circulation (both in print and digital) of the 56 newspapers tracked by Accertamenti Diffusione Stampa (ADS) was 1,947,230 in January 2022, down from 2,292,549 for 57 newspapers in January 2020.

Corriere della Sera, based in Milan, has the largest circulation — more than 250,000 on average —, and has more than 500,000 digital subscribers.

Political parties in Italy used to have their own newspapers, most of which have been either disbanded or transformed into online publications. Party newspapers have included Avanti! (est. 1896, Italian Socialist Party), Il Popolo d'Italia (est. 1914, Italian Socialist Party / National Fascist Party), La Voce Repubblicana (est. 1921, Italian Republican Party), Il Popolo (est. 1923, Italian People's Party / Christian Democracy / Italian People's Party), L'Unità (est. 1924, Italian Communist Party / Democratic Party of the Left / Democrats of the Left / Democratic Party), L'Umanità (est. 1947, Italian Democratic Socialist Party), La Discussione (est. 1952, Christian Democracy), Secolo d'Italia (est. 1952, Italian Social Movement), Liberazione (est. 1991, Communist Refoundation Party), La Padania (est. 1997, Lega Nord) and Europa (est. 2003, Democracy is Freedom – The Daisy / Democratic Party).

Countrywide
Listed according to circulation, updated to January 2023.

Regional/local
Listed according to circulation, updated to January 2023.

Sports
Listed according to circulation, updated to January 2023.

Publishers
Some media companies publish several newspapers:
 GEDI Gruppo Editoriale – La Repubblica, La Stampa, Messaggero Veneto, Il Secolo XIX, Il Piccolo, Gazzetta di Mantova, Il Mattino di Padova, La Provincia Pavese, La Tribuna di Treviso, La Nuova Venezia, Corriere delle Alpi
 RCS MediaGroup – Corriere della Sera, La Gazzetta dello Sport
 Caltagirone Editore – Il Messaggero, Il Mattino,  Il Gazzettino, Corriere Adriatico, Nuovo Quotidiano di Puglia
Gruppo SAE – Il Tirreno, Gazzetta di Reggio, Gazzetta di Modena, La Nuova Ferrara 
 Editoriale Nazionale –  Il Resto del Carlino, La Nazione, Il Giorno
 Gruppo Amodei – Corriere dello Sport – Stadio, Tuttosport
 Gruppo Athesis – L'Arena, Il Giornale di Vicenza
 Società Iniziative Editoriali - L'Adige, Alto Adige

See also
 List of magazines in Italy
 Mass media in Italy
 Telecommunications in Italy
 List of Italian telephone companies
 Television in Italy
 List of television channels in Italy
 List of radio stations in Italy
 Internet in Italy
 Censorship in Italy

References

Further reading
 
 
 
 
 1899 ed.
 1921 ed.
 
 

Italy

Newspapers